Susanne Niesner (born 7 October 1954) is a Swiss former backstroke and medley swimmer. She competed in five events at the 1972 Summer Olympics.

References

External links
 

1954 births
Living people
Swiss female backstroke swimmers
Swiss female medley swimmers
Olympic swimmers of Switzerland
Swimmers at the 1972 Summer Olympics
Place of birth missing (living people)
20th-century Swiss women